Mount Loodts is a mountain,  high, immediately east of Mount Lorette in the Belgica Mountains of Antarctica. It was discovered by the Belgian Antarctic Expedition, 1957–58, under G. de Gerlache, who named it for Jacques Loodts, geodesist with the expedition.

References

Mountains of Queen Maud Land
Princess Ragnhild Coast